APIX is an association of Internet exchange points in the Asia Pacific region. APIX is also part of the global IX-F Internet eXchange Federation.

See also
List of Internet exchange points

References

External links

Internet exchange points in Asia
Internet exchange points in Oceania
Internet exchange points
Internet-related organizations